Frederick Baldwin may refer to:
 Frederick Walker Baldwin (1882–1948), Canadian hydrofoil and aviation pioneer and partner of the inventor Alexander Graham Bell
 Frederick W. Baldwin (Vermont politician) (1848–1923), Vermont attorney, businessman, historian, author and politician
 Frederick C. Baldwin (1929–2021), American photographer